Zohaib Shera (born 18 August 1990) is a Pakistani first-class cricketer who plays for Port Qasim Authority. He made his Twenty20 cricket debut for Karachi Blues in the 2016–17 National T20 Cup on 6 September 2016.

References

External links
 

1990 births
Living people
Pakistani cricketers
Karachi Blues cricketers
Port Qasim Authority cricketers
Cricketers from Karachi